This is a list of Portland State Vikings football players in the NFL Draft.

Key

Selections

References

Portland State

Portland State Vikings NFL Draft